Tavis Knoyle (born 2 June 1990 in Pontneddfechan, Vale of Neath, Wales) is a Wales international rugby union footballer who plays at scrum-half.

He is a fluent Welsh speaker.

Club career
After a youth career at home town club Glynneath RFC, he made his senior debut at Neath RFC, and made his Celtic League debut with Ospreys in April 2009.

After impressing with Wales Under 20 squad, he joined the Scarlets at the start of the 2009/10 campaign, scoring his first try for the Scarlets in a victory over Ulster, and was awarded the Magners League Man of the Match.

On 16 May 2013, Knoyle signed to join English side Gloucester in the Aviva Premiership on a two-year contract, joining former Scarlets coach Nigel Davies who had been appointed Director of Rugby at the Kingsholm Stadium in June 2012.

On 5 February 2014, he signed an agreement to join Cardiff Blues.

Knoyle was loaned out to Pontypridd RFC 8 months later and made his debut for the club on 11 October 2014 against London Scottish in the British and Irish Cup. Knoyle played his final game for the valleys team against Connacht Eagles on 6 December 2014, before making his return to his parent regional side.

On 16 October 2016, Knoyle signed for Welsh region Dragons from the 2016–17 season. In doing so he would become only the third player to play for all four professional Welsh rugby regions.

Knoyle departed the Dragons during the 2021–22 season, joining Merthyr RFC soon after.

International career
Having played for Wales at Under 16 and Under 18 levels, under the tutelage of Phil Davies he won four Wales Under 20 caps in 2009.

Knoyle was named in the squad for the 2010 Wales rugby union tour of New Zealand, making his debut against New Zealand in Dunedin on 20 June 2010 as a second-half replacement. Knoyle was named in the Welsh squad for the 2011 Six Nations Championship, winning his second cap in the clash with Scotland at Murrayfield, replacing Mike Phillips in the 76th minute.

Knoyle was selected in the Wales squad for the 2011 Rugby World Cup, starting the pool match against Namibia. A shoulder injury ruled Knoyle of the 2012 Six Nations, but he returned to the squad for the 2012 end-of-year rugby union internationals, and named to start against Argentina, displacing veteran scrum half Mike Phillips.

While selected in the squad for the 2013 Six Nations, Knoyle did not feature in any test. His final involvement with the Wales squad came during the 2013 Wales rugby union tour of Japan, coming off the bench in both tests.

Knoyle has also represented Wales Sevens in the World Rugby Sevens Series.

References

External List
WRU Profile
Scarlets profile
Dragons profile

1990 births
Living people
Cardiff Rugby players
Dragons RFC players
Gloucester Rugby players
Glynneath RFC players
Llanelli RFC players
Neath RFC players
Ospreys (rugby union) players
Pontypridd RFC players
Rugby union players from Powys
Rugby union scrum-halves
Scarlets players
Sportspeople from Gloucestershire
Wales international rugby union players
Welsh rugby union players